Sciades parkeri, the gillbacker sea catfish, is a species of sea catfish found in coastal rivers in Brazil, French Guiana, Guyana, Suriname, and Venezuela. While usually no more than 90 cm in length, it can reach lengths of up to 190 cm and weigh up to 50 kg.

Etymology
The fish is named in honor of Traill's friend Charles Stewart Parker (1800-1868), a British merchant who supplied the author with a drawing of the catfish and its skin.

References

 

Ariidae
Fish of South America
Fish of Brazil
Fish described in 1832
Taxa named by Thomas Stewart Traill